Arf-GAP with Rho-GAP domain, ANK repeat and PH domain-containing protein 3 is a protein that in humans is encoded by the ARAP3 gene.

This gene encodes a phosphoinositide binding protein containing ARF-GAP, RHO-GAP, RAS-associating, and pleckstrin homology domains. The ARF-GAP and RHO-GAP domains cooperate in mediating rearrangements in the cell cytoskeleton and cell shape. It is a specific PtdIns(3,4,5)P3/PtdIns(3,4)P2-stimulated Arf6-GAP protein. An alternatively spliced transcript has been found for this gene, but its full-length nature has not been determined.

References

External links

Further reading